The Fan Song is the NATO reporting name for SNR-75 series of trailer-mounted E band/F band and G band fire control and tracking radars for use with the Soviet SA-2 Guideline surface-to-air missile system.

Description 
The Fan Song radars are capable of tracking a single target at a time, and can guide up to three missiles at once to it. The radars feature two orthogonal antennas, one for azimuth and one for elevation, which can operate in a track-while-scan mode. These antennas transmit 10 × 2 degree or 7.5 x 1.5 degree beams and perform a 'flapping' motion as they scan their sectors. 

The Fan Song E includes two additional parabolic dishes for narrow beam and LORO tracking modes.

See also 
 List of NATO reporting names for equipment
 List of radars

References 

Russian and Soviet military radars